Kuçova oil field is an Albanian oil field that was discovered in 1928. It is the second biggest on-shore oil field of Albania.

The field is operated by Albpetrol and Sherwood International Petroleum.

See also

Oil fields of Albania

References

Oil fields of Albania
Kuçovë